Dennis Gustafsson (born February 17, 1972) is a Swedish Bandy player who currently plays for Vetlanda BK as goalkeeper.  Dennis has made over 400 appearances in the Allsvenskan.

Dennis has played for three clubs-
 IFK Motala (1989–1999)
 Hammarby IF Bandy (1999–2003)
 IFK Motala (2003–2005)
 Vetlanda BK (2005–present)

External links
  dennis gustafsson at bandysidan
  vetlanda bk

Swedish bandy players
Living people
1972 births
IFK Motala players
Hammarby IF Bandy players
Vetlanda BK players